Homework is a 1989 Iranian narrative documentary film written, directed and edited by Abbas Kiarostami.

The film was shot on 16mm in late January and/or early February 1988 at Tehran's Shahid Masumi primary school.

Synopsis
The film consists almost exclusively of interviews with a number of pupils and two fathers of pupils at Shahid Masumi school who are asked to give their opinion on the traditional teaching practice of assigning homework. Issues such as some parents' illiteracy and their inability to help their children with the homework are raised. The children don't always succeed in hiding the more embarrassing aspects of their family life (corporal punishment, poverty, etc.).

Release 
Homework was included as a special feature in the Criterion Collection's release of the Koker trilogy.

See also
List of Iranian films

References

Bibliography
Deborah Young, "Mashgh-e shab (Homework)", Variety, no. 338, 7 March 1990, p. 32
Peter Matthews, "A Little Learning", Sight & Sound, vol. 12, no. 6, June 2002, pp. 30–32
Sonia Giardina, "Another Look at Homework by Abbas Kiarostami: An Investigation of a Pedagogic and Social Drama", Film International, no. 35, Summer 2002, p. 33
François Niney, "Devoirs de maison", Cahiers du cinéma, no. 449, November 1991, pp. 62–63
Danièle Parra, "Devoirs du soir", La Revue du cinéma, no. 477, December 1991, p. 41
François Niney, "Devoirs de soir", Cahiers du cinéma, no. 493, July/August 1995, pp. 107–108
Israel Diego Aragón, "Un documental de terror psicológico: Los deberes", in Letras de cine, no. 7, 2003, pp. 76–77

External links

 

Homework
1989 films
1980s Persian-language films
Iranian documentary films
1989 documentary films